Carpet sharks are sharks classified in the order Orectolobiformes . Sometimes the common name "carpet shark" (named so because many species resemble ornately patterned carpets) is used interchangeably with "wobbegong", which is the common name of sharks in the family Orectolobidae. Carpet sharks have five gill slits, two spineless dorsal fins, and a small mouth that does not extend past the eyes. Many species have barbels.

Characteristics
The carpet sharks are a diverse group of sharks with differing sizes, appearances, diets, and habits. They first appeared in the fossil record in the Early Jurassic; the oldest known orectolobiform genera are Folipistrix (known from Toarcian to Aalenian of Belgium and Germany), Palaeobrachaelurus (Aalenian to Barremian) and Annea (Toarcian to Bajocian of Europe). All species have two dorsal fins and a relatively short, transverse mouth that does not extend behind the eyes. Besides the nostrils are barbels, tactile sensory organs, and grooves known as nasoral grooves connect the nostrils to the mouth. Five short gill slits are just in front of the origin of the pectoral fin and the fifth slit tends to overlap the fourth one. A spiracle occurs beneath each eye which is used in respiration. The only exception to this rule is the whale shark, the spiracles of which are situated just behind the eyes. Carpet sharks derive their common name from the fact that many species have a mottled appearance with intricate patterns reminiscent of carpet designs. The patterning provides camouflage when the fish is lying on the seabed. It is the largest species of fish, but despite its size, is not dangerous, as it is a filter feeder, drawing in water through its wide mouth and sifting out the plankton. Some of the most spectacularly coloured members of the order are the necklace carpet shark (Parascyllium variolatum), the zebra shark (Stegostoma fasciatum), and the ornate wobbegong (Orectolobus ornatus). Nurse sharks and whale sharks have a fringe of barbels on their snouts, and barbelthroat carpet sharks (Cirrhoscyllium expolitum) have barbels dangling from their throat regions.

Behaviour
Most carpet sharks feed on the seabed in shallow to medium-depth waters, detecting and picking up molluscs, crustaceans, and other small creatures. The wobbegongs tend to be ambush predators, lying hidden on the seabed until prey approaches. One has been observed swallowing a bamboo shark whole.

The methods of reproduction of carpet sharks varies. Some species are oviparous and lay eggs which may be liberated directly into the water or may be enclosed in horny egg cases. Some female sharks have been observed to push egg cases into crevices and this would be an added protection for the developing embryos. Other species are ovoviviparous and the fertilised eggs are retained in the mother's oviduct. There, the developing embryos, which are usually few in number, feed on their yolk sacs at first and later hatch out and feed on nutrients secreted by the walls of the oviduct. The young are born in an advanced state, ready to live independent lives.

Distribution
Carpet sharks are found in all the oceans of the world but predominantly in tropical and temperate waters. They are most common in the western Indo-Pacific region and are usually found in relatively deep water.

Classification
The order is small, with seven families in 13 genera and with a total of around 43 species:

Order Orectolobiformes
 Family Brachaeluridae Applegate (blind sharks)
 Genus Brachaelurus Ogilby, 1908
 Brachaelurus colcloughi (Ogilby, 1908) (bluegrey carpetshark)
 Brachaelurus waddi (Bloch & J. G. Schneider, 1801) (blind shark)
 Family Ginglymostomatidae Gill, 1862 (nurse sharks)
 Genus Ginglymostoma J. P. Müller & Henle, 1837
 Ginglymostoma cirratum Bonnaterre, 1788 (nurse shark)
 Ginglymostoma unami Del-Moral-Flores, Ramírez-Antonio, Angulo & Pérez-Ponce de León, 2015 
 Genus Nebrius Rüppell, 1837
 Nebrius ferrugineus (Lesson, 1831) (tawny nurse shark)
 Genus Pseudoginglymostoma Dingerkus, 1986
 Pseudoginglymostoma brevicaudatum (Günther, 1867) (short-tail nurse shark)
 Family Hemiscylliidae Gill, 1862 (bamboo sharks)
 Genus Chiloscyllium J. P. Müller & Henle, 1837
 Chiloscyllium arabicum Gubanov, 1980 (Arabian carpetshark)
 Chiloscyllium burmensis Dingerkus & DeFino, 1983 (Burmese bamboo shark)
 Chiloscyllium griseum J. P. Müller & Henle, 1838 (grey bamboo shark)
 Chiloscyllium hasselti Bleeker, 1852 (Hasselt's bamboo shark)
 Chiloscyllium indicum (J. F. Gmelin, 1789) (slender bamboo shark)
 Chiloscyllium plagiosum (Anonymous, referred to Bennett, 1830) (white-spotted bamboo shark)
 Chiloscyllium punctatum J. P. Müller & Henle, 1838 (brownbanded bamboo shark)
 Genus Hemiscyllium J. P. Müller & Henle, 1837
 Hemiscyllium freycineti (Quoy & Gaimard, 1824) (Indonesian speckled carpetshark)
 Hemiscyllium galei G. R. Allen & Erdmann, 2008 (Cenderwasih epaulette shark)
 Hemiscyllium hallstromi Whitley, 1967 (Papuan epaulette shark)
 Hemiscyllium halmahera G. R. Allen, Erdmann & Dudgeon, 2013 (Halmahera epaulette shark)
 Hemiscyllium henryi G. R. Allen & Erdmann, 2008 (Henry's epaulette shark)
 Hemiscyllium michaeli G. R. Allen & Dudgeon, 2010 (Milne Bay epaulette shark)
 Hemiscyllium ocellatum (Bonnaterre, 1788) (epaulette shark)
 Hemiscyllium strahani Whitley, 1967 (hooded carpetshark)
 Hemiscyllium trispeculare J. Richardson, 1843 (speckled carpetshark)
 Family Orectolobidae Gill, 1896 (wobbegong sharks)
 Genus Eucrossorhinus Regan, 1908
 Eucrossorhinus dasypogon (Bleeker, 1867) (tasselled wobbegong)
 Genus Orectolobus Bonaparte, 1834
 Orectolobus floridus Last & Chidlow, 2008 (floral banded wobbegong)
 Orectolobus halei Whitley, 1940.
 Orectolobus hutchinsi Last, Chidlow & Compagno, 2006. (western wobbegong)
 Orectolobus japonicus Regan, 1906 (Japanese wobbegong)
 Orectolobus leptolineatus Last, Pogonoski & W. T. White, 2010 (Indonesian wobbegong)
 Orectolobus maculatus (Bonnaterre, 1788) (spotted wobbegong)
 Orectolobus ornatus (De Vis, 1883) (ornate wobbegong)
 Orectolobus parvimaculatus Last & Chidlow, 2008 (dwarf spotted wobbegong)
 Orectolobus reticulatus Last, Pogonoski & W. T. White, 2008 (network wobbegong)
 Orectolobus wardi Whitley, 1939 (northern wobbegong)
 Genus Sutorectus Whitley, 1939
 Sutorectus tentaculatus (W. K. H. Peters, 1864) (cobbler wobbegong)
 Family Parascylliidae Gill, 1862 (collared carpet sharks)
 Genus Cirrhoscyllium H. M. Smith & Radcliffe, 1913
 Cirrhoscyllium expolitum H. M. Smith & Radcliffe, 1913 (barbelthroat carpetshark)
 Cirrhoscyllium formosanum Teng, 1959 (Taiwan saddled carpetshark)
 Cirrhoscyllium japonicum Kamohara, 1943 (saddle carpetshark)
 Genus Parascyllium Gill, 1862
 Parascyllium collare E. P. Ramsay & Ogilby, 1888 (collared carpetshark)
 Parascyllium elongatum Last & Stevens, 2008 (elongate carpetshark)
 Parascyllium ferrugineum McCulloch, 1911 (rusty carpetshark)
 Parascyllium sparsimaculatum T. Goto & Last, 2002 (ginger carpetshark)
 Parascyllium variolatum (A. H. A. Duméril, 1853) (necklace carpetshark)
 Family Rhincodontidae (J. P. Müller & Henle, 1839) (whale sharks)
 Genus Rhincodon A. Smith, 1828
 Rhincodon typus A. Smith, 1828 (whale shark)
 Family Stegostomatidae Gill, 1862 (zebra sharks)
 Genus Stegostoma J. P. Müller & Henle, 1837
 Stegostoma fasciatum (Hermann, 1783) (zebra shark)

See also

 List of sharks

References

Further reading
 Compagno, Leonard (2002) Sharks of the World: Bullhead, mackerel and carpet sharks Volume 2, FAO Species Catalogue, Rome. .

External links
 Reefquest page on carpet sharks
 FishBase page on Orectolobiformes
 http://www.elasmo-research.org/education/topics/d_checklist.htm

 

Extant Early Jurassic first appearances